Stuart MacRae (born 12 August 1976) is a Scottish composer.

Education and career 

Stuart MacRae was born in Inverness, Scotland.  He studied at Durham University with Philip Cashian and Michael Zev Gordon, and subsequently with Simon Bainbridge and Robert Saxton at the Guildhall School of Music and Drama. By his mid-twenties he was writing astonishingly original and powerfully expressive works, and was receiving commissions from organisations such as the BBC and the London Sinfonietta as well as being appointed Composer-in-Association with the BBC Scottish Symphony Orchestra. Often inspired by aspects of nature and humans' relationship to it, MacRae's style draws on various strands of European modernism, including the music of Igor Stravinsky, Elliott Carter, Iannis Xenakis, Harrison Birtwistle and Peter Maxwell Davies.

Key works 

 The Witch's Kiss (1997; chamber ensemble)
 Violin Concerto (2001)
 Ancrene Wisse (2002; choir, orchestra)
 Motus (2003; chamber ensemble)
 Echo and Narcissus (2006; chamber ensemble/dance)
 Birches (2007; chamber orchestra)
 Gaudete (2008; soprano and orchestra)
 Earth (2010; orchestra)
 Prometheus Symphony (2019; soprano and bass-baritone soloists and orchestra)

Operas 

 The Assassin Tree (2006; chamber opera)
 Remembrance Day (2009; chamber opera)
 Ghost Patrol (2011; chamber opera)
 The Devil Inside (2016)
 Anthropocene (2019)

Awards 

 2013 South Bank Sky Arts Award for Opera for Ghost Patrol.

Career highlights 

 1993-7 – studies at Durham University, then Guildhall School of Music and Drama.
 1996 – finalist in Lloyd's Bank Young Composers' workshop.
 1997 – premiere of The Witch’s Kiss with BBC Philharmonic Orchestra and Peter Maxwell Davies.
 1999–2003 – Composer-in-Association of BBC Scottish Symphony Orchestra.
 2001 – MacRae portrait concert conducted by James MacMillan at Edinburgh International Festival.
 2001 – Violin Concerto premiered at BBC Proms.
 2006 – The Assassin Tree, MacRae's first opera premiered at Edinburgh International Festival.
 2008 – Gaudete premiered at BBC Proms.
 2012 – Ghost Patrol premiered by Scottish Opera and Music Theatre Wales.

Selected recordings 
 The City Inside – Black Box BBM1058
 Piano Sonata – Delphian DCD 34009
 Tol-Pedn – Kairos 0012442KAI
 Interact – London Sinfonietta SINF CD1-2006
 Violin Concerto, Two Scenes from the Death of Count Ugolino, Motus, Stirling Choruses – NMC D115

References

External links 
 Stuart MacRae's website
 Stuart MacRae's homepage at Novello & Co.

Scottish classical composers
Alumni of the College of St Hild and St Bede, Durham
Alumni of the Guildhall School of Music and Drama
Alumni of the University of Edinburgh
1976 births
Living people
British male classical composers
20th-century classical composers
20th-century British composers
21st-century British composers
21st-century classical composers
21st-century British musicians
20th-century British male musicians
21st-century British male musicians